The Pavilion of Dreams is the second album from minimalist composer Harold Budd and produced by Brian Eno. Billed as "an extended cycle of works begun in 1972," it was recorded in 1976 but not released until 1978 on Eno's label Obscure Records. It was later re-released on Editions EG in 1981.

Reception
AllMusic wrote positively of the album, stating that in "mixing ethereal melodies communicated by voice or saxophone with glissando accompaniment, Harold Budd creates a series of siren songs on The Pavilion of Dreams that shimmer like light reflected on the water's surface."

Track listing 
 "Bismillahi 'Rrahman 'Rrahim" – 18:23
 "Two Songs: 1. Let Us Go into the House of the Lord / 2. Butterfly Sunday" – 6:19
 "Madrigals of the Rose Angel: 1. Rossetti Noise / 2. The Crystal Garden and a Coda" – 14:16
 "Juno" – 8:18

Personnel 
 Marion Brown – alto saxophone
 Harold Budd – piano, voice
 Maggie Thomas – harp
 Richard Bernas – celeste
 Gavin Bryars – glockenspiel, voice
 Jo Julian – marimba, vibraphone, voice
 Michael Nyman – marimba, voice
 John White – marimba, percussion, voice
 Howard Rees – marimba, vibraphone
 Nigel Shipway – percussion
 Richard Bernas – piano
 Brian Eno – voice
 Lynda Richardson, Margaret Cable, Lesley Reid, Ursula Connors, Alison MacGregor, Muriel Dickinson – chorus

References 

 Track titles and times taken from the disc itself, but the titles can be verified through the Amazon.com product page.
 Translation of "Bismillahi 'Rrahman 'Rrahim" from original album insert.

Harold Budd albums
1978 albums
Albums produced by Brian Eno
E.G. Records albums
Ambient albums by American artists
Obscure Records albums